This was the first edition of the tournament.

Roger Federer won his 85th ATP title, defeating Pablo Cuevas in the final, 6–3, 7–6(13–11).

Seeds
The top four seeds receive a bye into the second round.

Draw

Finals

Top half

Bottom half

Qualifying

Seeds

Qualifiers

Qualifying draw

First qualifier

Second qualifier

Third qualifier

Fourth qualifier

References
 Main Draw
 Qualifying Draw

2015 ATP World Tour
2015 in Istanbul
2015 in Turkish tennis
2015 Singles